Okalica is a river of Poland, a tributary of the Łeba, which it meets at the town of Lębork.

Rivers of Poland
Rivers of Pomeranian Voivodeship
2Okalica